Here is a list of aircraft used by the Soviet VVS during the Second World War.

Fighter aircraft 

 Bell P-39 Airacobra (5,007 supplied from the United States, 4,719 reached Soviet Union)
 Bell P-63 Kingcobra (2,421 supplied from the United States)
 Curtiss P-40 Kittyhawk/Tomahawk (2,425 supplied from the United States) 
 Hawker Hurricane (2,952 supplied from UK)
 Lavochkin-Gorbunov-Gudkov LaGG-1 (100)
 Lavochkin-Gorbunov-Gudkov LaGG-3 (6,528)
 Lavochkin La-5 (9,920)
 Lavochkin La-7 (5,753)
 Lavochkin La-9 (1,559)
 Mikoyan-Gurevich MiG-1 
 Mikoyan-Gurevich MiG-3
 North American P-51 Mustang (small numbers supplied) 
 Petlyakov Pe-3
 Polikarpov I-15
 Polikarpov I-153
 Polikarpov I-16
 Republic P-47 Thunderbolt (195 supplied from the United States)
 Supermarine Spitfire (1,331 supplied from UK)
 Yakovlev Yak-1
 Yakovlev Yak-3
 Yakovlev Yak-7
 Yakovlev Yak-9

Bomber and Attack Aircraft 

 Arkhangelsky Ar-2
 De Havilland Mosquito
 Douglas A-20 Havoc (2,771 supplied from the United States)
 Handley Page Hampden (23 supplied by the United Kingdom)
 Ilyushin DB-3
 Ilyushin Il-2 Shturmovik
 Ilyushin Il-4
 Ilyushin Il-10 Shturmovik
 North American B-25 Mitchell (862 supplied from the United States)
 Petlyakov Pe-2
 Petlyakov Pe-8
 Polikarpov Po-2
 Sukhoi Su-2
 Tupolev SB
 Tupolev TB-3
 Tupolev Tu-2
 Yakovlev Yak-2
 Yakovlev Yak-4
 Yermolayev Yer-2

Reconnaissance/Patrol Aircraft

 Beriev Be-2
 Beriev Be-4
 Beriev MBR-2
 Consolidated PBY/PBN Catalina (186 supplied through lend-lease from US)
 Curtiss O-52 Owl (19 supplied through lend-lease from US) 
 Kharkov R-10
 Polikarpov Po-2
 Polikarpov R-5
 Polikarpov R-Z
 Tupolev ANT-7
 Vought OS2U Kingfisher (20 supplied through lend-lease from US)

Transport Aircraft 

 Antonov A-7
 Armstrong Whitworth Albemarle (12 supplied by the United Kingdom)
 Curtiss C-46 Commando (1 supplied through lend-lease from the US)
 Douglas C-47 Skytrain (707 supplied through lend-lease from the US)
 Gribovsky G-11
 Kolesnikov-Tsibin KC-20
 Lisunov Li-2
 Polikarpov Po-2
 Tupolev ANT-9
 Tupolev TB-1
 Tupolev TB-3
 Vultee PS-43 (licence built Vultee V-11GB)
 Yakovlev Yak-6

Trainers 

 North American T-6 Texan (82 supplied through lend-lease from US)
 Polikarpov U-2
 Yakovlev UT-1
 Yakovlev UT-2
 Yakovlev Yak-7U

Weapons and munitions

Machine guns
 7.7-mm (0.303-inch) Browning Mk II machine gun
 7.7-mm (0.303-inch) Vickers K machine gun
 7.62-mm (0.30-inch) M.1919 Browning machine gun
 7.62-mm (0.30-inch) DA machine gun
 7.62-mm (0.30-inch) PV-1 machine gun
 7.62-mm (0.30-inch) ShKAS machine gun
 12.7-mm (0.50-inch) Berezin UB machine gun
 12.7-mm (0.50-inch) Browning AN/M2 machine gun

Cannons 
20-mm (0.79-inch) Hispano Mk.II cannon
 20-mm (0.79-inch) ShVAK cannon
23-mm (0.91-inch) Volkov-Yartsev VYa-23 cannon
37-mm (1.46-inch) M4 autocannon
 37-mm (1.5-inch) Nudelmam-Suranov cannon
 45-mm (1.8-inch) Nudelman-Suranov cannon

Bombs 
 FAB-25
FAB-50
 FAB-100
 FAB-250
 FAB-500
 FAB-2000
 FAB-5000 bomb
 KhAB-500
 PTAB (bomb)
 Molotov bread basket

Rockets 
 RS-82 and RS-132 Rockets
 BETAB-750DS rocket

Torpedoes 
 450-mm (17.17 inch) Type 45-36AN torpedo

See also 
 List of military aircraft of the Soviet Union and the CIS

Notes

Military history of the Soviet Union during World War II
Soviet Air Force
Soviet and Russian military aircraft
Russian and Soviet military-related lists
Red Army